Carl Christian Vilhelm Liebe (30 November 1820 – 24 August 1900) was a Danish politician representing first the National Liberal Party and later the conservative Højre, lawyer and speaker of the Landsting, a chamber of the parliament. He was an elected member of the Folketing from 1861 to 1866, and a royally appointed member of the Landsting from 1866 to 1895.

In the 1855 case at the Court of Impeachment against members of the Cabinet of Ørsted, he was defence lawyer for Frederik Ferdinand von Tillisch, Christian Albrecht Bluhme, Wilhelm Sponneck and Anton Wilhelm Scheel.

One of his sons was Otto Liebe, Prime Minister of Denmark.

References
Bille, C. St. A. (1896). "Liebe, Carl Christian Vilhelm"  in C. F. Bricka (ed.) Dansk Biografisk Lexikon tillige omfattende Norge for Tidsrummet 1537–1814. X. bind, Laale — Løvenørn. Copenhagen: Gyldendal, pp. 268–72.
Engelstoft, P. (1923). "Liebe, Carl Christian Vilhelm"  in Dahl, Svend; Engelstoft, P. (eds.) Dansk Biografisk Haandleksikon, andet bind. Copenhagen: Gyldendal, pp. 497–498.
Iuul, Stig (1953). "Rigsretten"  in Fabricius, Knud; Bomholt, Jul.; Hjelholt, Holger; Mackeprang, M.; Møller, Andr. (eds.) Den Danske Rigsdag 1849–1949 bind V. Copenhagen: J. H. Schultz forlag.

1820 births
1900 deaths
19th-century Danish lawyers
Members of the Folketing
Speakers of the Landsting (Denmark)
People from Roskilde